The 1997 James Madison Dukes football team was an American football team that represented James Madison University during the 1997 NCAA Division I-AA football season as a member of the Atlantic 10 Conference. In their third year under head coach Alex Wood, the team compiled a 5–6 record.

Schedule

References

James Madison
James Madison Dukes football seasons
James Madison Dukes football